The discography of Australian electronic music duo, consists of four studio albums, one remix albums, four extended plays and twenty-seven singles.

Albums

Studio albums

Remix albums

Extended plays

Singles

Remixes 
 The Dissociatives – "We're Much Preferred Customers" (2004)
 Midnight Juggernauts – "Devil Within" (2005)
 Paul Mac – "It's Not Me, It's You" (2005)
 Caged Baby – "Hello There" (2006)
 Lenny Kravitz – "Breathe" (2006)
 Howling Bells – "Low Happening" (2007)
 Silverchair – "Straight Lines" (2007)
 Architecture in Helsinki – "Heart It Races" (2007) 
 Sam Sparro – "Pocket" (2008)
 Sarah Blasko – "Hold on My Heart" (2010)
 Kings of Leon – "Closer" (2010)
 Kylie Minogue – "I Was Gonna Cancel" (2014)
 Rüfüs – "Unforgiven" (2014)
 Röyksopp – "I Had This Thing" (2015)
 Tove Lo – "Sadder Badder Cooler" (2020)

References

External links
Official Grinspoon Website

Discographies of Australian artists